Radivoj Panić (born January 8, 1975) is Serbian former footballer who played as a midfielder, and is a football manager.

Playing career
Panic played with FK Beograd, FK Zemun, and FK Obilić. In 2001, he played in the First League of FR Yugoslavia with Sartid Smederevo, where he featured in the 2001 UEFA Intertoto Cup against Dundee F.C., and TSV 1860 Munich. In 2018, he was assigned the player-coach for SC Waterloo Region in the Canadian Soccer League.

References

1975 births
Living people
Serbian footballers
Serbian football managers
FK Beograd players
FK Zemun players
FK Smederevo players
SC Waterloo Region players
First League of Serbia and Montenegro players
Canadian Soccer League (1998–present) managers
Canadian Soccer League (1998–present) players
Association football midfielders